Martina Danišová-Hrašnová (born 21 March 1983) is a Slovak hammer thrower. Her personal best throw is 76.90 metres, achieved in May 2009 in Trnava. She was suspended from the sport from August 2003 to August 2005, because a doping out-of-competition test found nandrolon in her body. She was taking maternity in the 2010 season.

Achievements

References

External links
 
 
 
 Martina Hrašnová at the Slovenský Olympijský Výbor 
 

1983 births
Living people
Slovak female hammer throwers
Athletes (track and field) at the 2008 Summer Olympics
Athletes (track and field) at the 2012 Summer Olympics
Athletes (track and field) at the 2016 Summer Olympics
Olympic athletes of Slovakia
Sportspeople from Bratislava
Doping cases in athletics
Slovak sportspeople in doping cases
World Athletics Championships medalists
European Athletics Championships medalists
World Athletics Championships athletes for Slovakia
European Games silver medalists for Slovakia
Athletes (track and field) at the 2015 European Games
European Games medalists in athletics
Universiade medalists in athletics (track and field)
Universiade silver medalists for Slovakia
Competitors at the 2007 Summer Universiade
Medalists at the 2009 Summer Universiade
Athletes (track and field) at the 2020 Summer Olympics